The cuneiform sign en, is a common-use sign of the Amarna letters, the Epic of Gilgamesh, and other cuneiform texts (for example Hittite texts). It has a secondary sub-use in the Amarna letters for ka4.

Linguistically, it has the alphabetical usage in texts for n, e, or en, and also a replacement for "e", by vowels, a, or i, or u.

Epic of Gilgamesh usage
The en sign usage in the Epic of Gilgamesh is as follows: (en, 32 times, and EN, 184 times). EN in the Epic of Gilgamesh is used for Akkadian, adi (English "until, plus", and Akkdian bēlu), for "lord, owner".

References

 Parpola, 1971. The Standard Babylonian Epic of Gilgamesh, Parpola, Simo, Neo-Assyrian Text Corpus Project, c 1997, Tablet I thru Tablet XII, Index of Names, Sign List,

Cuneiform signs